Kenton was a German brand of cigarettes, manufactured in East Germany.

History
Kenton was available in the variants "Aromatic Blend" (Blue), "Menthol" (Green) and "American Blend", later renamed in "Extra Quality" (Red). The cigarettes had a filter and a length of 85 mm. The retail sales price was 3.20 Deutsche Mark in 1989. The packaging was a white soft pack with similarly colored diagonal stripes. These cigarettes were produced in the 1980s by the Bulgarian company Bulgartabac in Blagoevgrad.

See also

 Tobacco smoking

References

Cigarette brands